Clearfield Armory is a historic National Guard armory located in Lawrence Township, Clearfield County, Pennsylvania, United States.  It was built for Troop A, 103rd Cavalry of the Pennsylvania National Guard.  It is a two-story brick structure constructed in 1938 in the Moderne style.

It was listed on the National Register of Historic Places in 1989.

See also 
 National Register of Historic Places listings in Clearfield County, Pennsylvania

References 
 

Armories on the National Register of Historic Places in Pennsylvania
Pennsylvania National Guard
Infrastructure completed in 1938
Buildings and structures in Clearfield County, Pennsylvania
National Register of Historic Places in Clearfield County, Pennsylvania